Senator Norcross may refer to:

Amasa Norcross (1824–1898), Massachusetts State Senate
Arthur D. Norcross (1848–1916), Massachusetts State Senate
Donald Norcross (born 1958), New Jersey State Senate